Phu Wiang is a district (amphoe) in the northwestern part of Khon Kaen province, northeastern Thailand.

Geography
Neighboring districts are (from the northeast clockwise): Ubolratana, Nong Ruea, Chum Phae, Wiang Kao, Nong Na Kham of Khon Kaen Province and Non Sang of Nong Bua Lamphu province.

A prehistoric Iron Age archaeological site, None Nok Tha is in the district, as is the Phu Wiang National Park.

Administration
The district is divided into 11 subdistricts (tambons), which are further subdivided into 114 villages (mubans). Phu Wiang is a subdistrict municipality (thesaban tambon) and covers parts of tambon Phu Wiang. There are a further 11 tambon administrative organizations (TAO).

Missing numbers are tambons which now form the districts Wiang Kao and Nong Na Kham.

References

External links
amphoe.com (Thai)

Phu Wiang